The Jamaica Rural Police Force, popularly known as the District Constable (D.C.), is an auxiliary to the Jamaica Constabulary Force. District constables are appointed by the Commissioner of Police and attached to a particular Police Station. Their powers and authority, like the regular police, extend to all parts of the Island. Appointments of district constables are published in the Jamaica Gazette and Force Orders. Men and women can be appointed as district constables.

Role
The District Constable (DC) is concerned with community patrolling and policing in order to minimize the incidence of crime. District Constables normally reside in the community that forms part of their area of responsibility.

The current strength of the DC is 1,325. District Constables are paid $61,000 monthly .

Uniform
Since mid-2009, members of the Rural Police Force (D.C) have been assigned uniform. They are dressed in light blue blouse (female) and light blue shirt (male) with Jamaica Constabulary, District Constable crest and dark blue skirt (female) and dark blue pants (male).

Training

Members of the Jamaica Rural Police Force (District Constable), undergo a 4–6 weeks of basic training at the Jamaica Police Academy in Twickenham Park, Spanish Town, St. Catherine.

District Constables Basic training mainly consists of:

Law and Police Duties.

Community Policing.

Use and Care of Firearms.

Defence Tactics and Drill.

See also
Island Special Constabulary Force
Jamaica Constabulary Force
Jamaica Police Cadet Corps

Law enforcement in Jamaica